Boivre-la-Vallée is a commune in the Vienne department in the Nouvelle-Aquitaine region in western France. It was established on 1 January 2019 by merger of the former communes of Lavausseau (the seat), Benassay, La Chapelle-Montreuil and Montreuil-Bonnin.

Population

See also
Communes of the Vienne department

References

Communes of Vienne